Dismorphia arcadia is a butterfly in the  family Pieridae. It is found from Colombia to Bolivia.

Subspecies
The following subspecies are recognised:
Dismorphia arcadia arcadia (Colombia)
Dismorphia arcadia hippotas (Hewitson, 1875) (Ecuador)
Dismorphia arcadia medorina Hewitson, 1875 (Bolivia)
Dismorphia arcadia lucilla Butler, 1899 (Ecuador)
Dismorphia arcadia heloisa Lamas, 2004 (Peru)

References

Dismorphiinae
Pieridae of South America
Lepidoptera of Peru
Invertebrates of Bolivia
Butterflies described in 1862